Skanda (Chinese:塞建陀, 室建陀), also known as Wei Tuo (Chinese: 韋馱) and Idaten (Japanese: 韋駄天) is a Mahayana bodhisattva regarded as a devoted guardian of Buddhist monasteries who protects the teachings of Buddhism. He is also sometimes called in the Chinese tradition "Hufa Weituo Zuntian Pusa", meaning "Honored Dharma Protector Skanda Bodhisattva", because he is one of the twenty-four celestial guardian deities mentioned in the Golden Light Sutra.

In Chinese temples, Skanda faces the statue of the Buddha in the main shrine, traditionally unarmed and with his hands in anjali. In others, he is on the far right of the main shrine with weapon in hand, whereas on the left is his counterpart, Sangharama (personified as the historical general Guan Yu). In Chinese sutras, his image is found at the end of the sutra, a reminder of his vow to protect and preserve the teachings.

According to legends, Skanda was the son of a virtuous king who had complete faith in Buddha's teachings. When the Buddha entered nirvana, the Buddha instructed Skanda to guard the Dharma. It was his duty to protect members of the sangha when they are disturbed by Mara, the tempter, and also to resolve conflicts amongst members of the sangha. A few days after the Buddha's passing and cremation, evil demons stole his relics. Skanda's vow of protecting the faith and Dharma was proven when he managed to defeat the evil demons and returned the relics.

Origins

Stories vary on how Skanda was accepted into the traditional Chinese Buddhist pantheon. Some have proposed that Skanda's features were adapted from a Chinese deity who appeared in the Chinese classical Ming novel Fengshen Yanyi. However, the existence of illustrated Skanda images predating the Ming Dynasty set his origins back to an earlier period in the development of Chinese Buddhism.

Skanda is described as a young man fully clad in the armor and headgear of a Chinese general, and is usually leaning on a vajra staff. Some suggest that Skanda may have come from Hinduism as the war deity Kartikeya (Murugan), who bears the title Skanda. Others point out that Skanda might also be a manifestation of Vajrapani, a bodhisattva who bears some relations to Skanda because they both wield vajras as weapons, are portrayed with flaming halos, and are both heavenly protectors of Buddhism.

Although Skanda is only a deva, he is very often addressed as a bodhisattva.

As Miao Shan's lover
When the bodhisattva Avalokitesvara was reincarnated as the princess Miao Shan, Skanda (known as Wei Tuo in this story) was one of her cruel father's generals. He loved Miao Shan but realized he could not possibly be a proper partner to her, since she was a pure person. However, Wei Tuo was inspired by Miao Shan's kindness so he decided to stay faithful and devoted to Miao Shan, even if she wasn't his wife. The two escaped Miao Shan's father, and the general-suitor helped build Miao Shan a temple and a kingdom of her own. Soon, however, the cruel king found them and killed them both. The general, because of his devotion to Guan Yin, transformed into a bodhisattva himself, who vowed to always serve and protect Guan Yin. His appearance as a Chinese general is the direct forebear to his connection with Miao Shan.

As a warrior
Another story says that Miao Shan was told to commit suicide by her grandmother. Her grandmother forced Miao Shan to leap into the sea because she was thought to have been an incarnation of a demon, when in fact she was not. The emperor told a loyal soldier named Luo Ping to pretend to throw Miao Shan into the ocean. He brought her with Yin Ma, the mother of Wei Tuo, to her village. Years passed, when an evil fish demon came. A disloyal soldier named Huo Yi was sent by the fish demon to kill Miao Shan. The fish demon wanted revenge on Miao Shan because she was the incarnation of Ci Hang Da Shi, a Buddhist deva that put the fish in a lotus pond. Huo Yi and his troops went to the village where Miao Shan and Wei Tuo lived and fought. Huo Yi's son killed Wei Tuo. After Miao Shan became the bodhisattva Avalokitesvara, she made Skanda a bodhisattva guardian. He became a bodhisattva because he took care of Miao Shan and loved her as a sister.

According to the lunar calendar, his birthday is the 3rd day of the 6th lunar month.

Gallery

See also

Dharmapala
Kataragama deviyo, the Sri Lankan Buddhist representation of Skanda
Kartikkeya, the Hindu equivalent
Śakra (Buddhism)
Tara (Buddhism)

Bodhisattvas
Buddhist gods
Chinese gods
Golden Light Sutra
Twenty-Four Protective Deities